August Casimir Erker (January 16, 1879 – November 29, 1951), was an American rower who competed in the 1904 Summer Olympics. In 1904 he rowed in the American crew which won the gold medal in the coxless fours.

See also
Erker's Optical

References

External links
 profile

1879 births
1951 deaths
Rowers at the 1904 Summer Olympics
Olympic gold medalists for the United States in rowing
American male rowers
Medalists at the 1904 Summer Olympics